Loxodromic may refer to:

 a loxodrome, see rhumb line
 a loxodromic transform, see Möbius transformation#Loxodromic transforms
 Loxodromic navigation, a method of navigation by following a rhumb line